Derek Dek Woolfson (born 7 July 1965) is a British chemist and biochemist. He is a professor of chemistry and biochemistry. and director of the Bristol BioDesign Institute at the University of Bristol, and founder of synthetic biology spin-out company Rosa Biotech.

Early life and education 
Woolfson was born on 7 July 1965 in Birmingham, UK. He attended King's Norton Boys' School (1976–1983). Woolfson was awarded a Bachelor of Science degree in chemistry from the University of Oxford in 1987, doing undergraduate research with Christopher M. Dobson. He obtained his PhD in chemistry and biochemistry from the University of Cambridge in 1991 under the supervision of Prof. D. H. Williams (chemistry) and Dr. P. A. Evans (biochemistry).

Career 
Woolfson undertook post-doctoral research at University College London (1991–1992), and at the University of California, Berkeley (1992–1994), before accepting a Lectureship in Biochemistry at the University of Bristol from 1994 to 1995.

The following year, Woolfson was appointed Lecturer and later Professor of Biochemistry at the University of Sussex, where he worked until 2005. Since 2005, Woolfson has held a joint chair between the Schools of Chemistry and Biochemistry at the University of Bristol.

Woolfson was Principal Investigator and Director of the UKRI-funded Synthetic Biology Research Centre, BrisSynBio at the University of Bristol. He is director of the Bristol BioDesign Institute at the University of Bristol and founding director of the Max Planck-Bristol Centre for Minimal Biology. In 2019 he founded the spin-out company Rosa Biotech.

Research 
Woolfson applies chemical and physical methods and principles to understand biological phenomena, such as protein folding and stability.

He is interested in how weak non-covalent interactions determine the structures and functions of proteins; and also the challenge of rational protein design and how this can be applied in synthetic biology and biotechnology.

Using a combination of rational and computational design, Woolfson explores making completely new protein structures and materials not known to natural biology.

The current focuses of his group are in the parametric design of protein structures, assemblies and materials; and in porting these into living cells to augment natural biology.

His work focuses on the folding, assembly, prediction, modelling and design of coiled-coil proteins.

Awards and honours 
2011 – Medimmune Protein and Peptide Science Award of the Royal Society of Chemistry.
2014 – Royal Society Wolfson Research Merit Award.
2016 – Interdisciplinary Prize of the Royal Society of Chemistry
2020 – Humboldt Research Award, also known as the Humboldt Prize

References 

1965 births
Living people